The Neelum River, or Kishanganga River, is a river in the Kashmir region of India and Pakistan. It originates in Bandipora district of northern Jammu and Kashmir in India, flows through the Neelam Valley in Pakistan's Azad Kashmir, where parts of its course fall along the Line of Control, before merging with the Jhelum River near the city of Muzaffarabad.

Name of the river

The river has traditionally been known as the Kishanganga River and is still known as such in India; after the partition of India in 1947, the river was renamed the Neelum River in Pakistan in 1956.

Basin 
Shardadesh is a name for the drainage basin of the Kishanganga River.

Course

The Kishanganga River originates from Krishansar Lake in the vicinity of Sonamarg in  the Indian union territory of Jammu and Kashmir, and runs northwards to Badoab village in Tulail Valley where it meets a tributary from the Dras side. Then it runs westwards, parallel to the Kashmir Line of Control. It is fed by many glacial tributary streams on its way. It enters Pakistani self-governing territory of Azad Kashmir in the Gurez sector of the Line of Control. Then it again runs west, parallel to the Line of Control, passing by Sharada.  After Sharda, it bends to a southwesterly direction and runs along the Line of Control near Tithwal. Then it bends northwest again, making a wide arc to join the Jhelum River in Muzaffarabad..Recently the Go Gurez campaign has been launched to make people aware of the area.

Valleys 

The Kishanganga River is 245 kilometres long. It covers 50 kilometers in the Indian-administered Kashmir where it flows through the Tulail Valley and then Gurez Valley. It covers the remaining 195 kilometres in Pakistan-administered Kashmir and flows through the. From its origin it flows through the Neelam Valley. 

The Neelum Valley is a Himalayan gorge in the Kashmir region, along which the Neelum River flows. This green and fertile valley is 250 km in length and stretches its way from Muzaffarabad all the way to Athmuqam and beyond to Taobutt. It is one of the most attractive tourists places, like Swat and Chitral, but due to poor road system is yet veiled to the outside world. This area was badly affected by the 2005 earthquake and was cut off from the outside world as the roads and paths were filled with rubble. Now construction of an international standard road is in progress. There are two entrances for Neelum valley, one Neelum Road by Muzaffarabad and the other by Kaghan the Jalkhad Road. Generally Neelum valley starts just after Muzaffarabad but in political division the area from Muzaffarabad to Chelhana is named Kotla valley. District Neelum starts from Chelhana and goes up to Taobutt.

Ecology

Revival of fish species 

There are different kinds of fish found in abundance in the Neelum River. As the river almost entirely runs across the Line of Control, being the main cause for Kashmir conflict there is a feeling of uncertainty among the inhabitants, many of them have emigrated to safer places, which has left the river banks scarcely populous and kept the river in perfect conditions for growth of fish. The most famous among the different variety of fish found in Neelum River are:
Brown trout (Salmo trutta)
Rainbow trout (Oncorhynchus mykiss)
Snow trout (Schizothorax plagiostomus)
Shuddgurn
Anyour

Dams

Kishanganga dam in India 

In the Indian union territory of Jammu and Kashmir, the construction work on the 330 MW Kishanganga Hydroelectric Plant project has started, after being defunct for eighteen years. Recently, the project was awarded to Hindustan Construction Company (HCC) with a timeline of seven years. The 330 MW Kishanganga hydro-electric power project involves damming of the Kishanganga River and the proposed 37 metre reservoir will submerge some parts of the Gurez valley. The water of Kishen Ganga River will be diverted through a 24 kilometre tunnel dug through the mountains to Bandipore where it will join the Wular Lake and then Jhelum River.

Neelum–Jhelum dam in Pakistan 

Similarly, Pakistan is constructing the 969 MW Neelum–Jhelum Hydropower Plant; the country has placed the project in the hands of a Chinese consortium. Pakistan claims that the Indian dam project will violate the Indus Waters Treaty and has pursued formal arbitration proceedings against India over the matter.

Religious significance 

Krishansar Lake and Sharada Peeth are important religious site for Hindus, who undertake the annual pilgrimage to these sites along the Kishanganga River. In the ancient times it was among the prominent centre of learning in the subcontinent in part with Nalanda and Taxila. Sharada script the - native script for the Kashmiri language is named in the honor of main deity of Sharada Peeth. Sharada Peeth is one of the most venerated site for the Kashmiri Pandits. Sharada Peeth temple was damaged in the 2005 Kashmir earthquake.  the Supreme Court of Pakistan ordered the Government to conserve the Sharada Peeth temple and the govt to identify and restore temples and gurudwaras.  The "Save Sharada Committee" of concerned Hindus has been demanding the opening of special corridor from India to Sharada Peeth in Pakistan-administered Kashmir for the visits of Hindu pilgrims from India.

See also 
 Karen Village

References

External links
 The course of the Neelum River plotted on OpenStreetMap: part 1, part 2, part 3,  part 4, part 5, part 6
 Neelum Valley.zoomshare
 Neelum Valley Official

Rivers of Azad Kashmir
Rivers of Jammu and Kashmir
Indus basin
International rivers of Asia
Rivers of Pakistan
Rivers of India